Dan Feyer is a crossword solver and editor and the eight-time winner of the American Crossword Puzzle Tournament (ACPT). He holds the tournament record for the most championships ever, with eight total championships, and the most consecutive championships with six. He was described by the New York Times as "the wizard who is fastest of all," solving the New York Times' Saturday crossword in an average of 4:03 minutes each week and the Sunday crossword in an average 5:38 minutes. 
He is listed in the Guinness World Records for both "Most wins of the American Crossword Puzzle Tournament" and "most consecutive ACPT wins."

Puzzle career
Feyer began solving puzzles seriously in 2006, after watching the documentary Wordplay about the ACPT. He first entered the ACPT in 2008, placing 45th. In 2009 he placed 4th. From 2010 until 2015 he placed 1st; in 2016 he placed 2nd to Howard Barkin; in 2017 he placed 1st; in 2018 he placed 2nd to Erik Agard; in 2019 he again placed 1st. In 2021 the tournament was held virtually for the first time and Feyer finished 8th.

In 2009, Feyer won the Express Division of the Lollapuzzoola puzzle tournament, for which he has also constructed.

In 2014, his rivalry with Tyler Hinman was described by Time as "America's most elite crossword puzzle rivalry," with veteran crossword editor Will Shortz describing them as "in a class of their own, the type who can flawlessly tear through a New York Times Sunday crossword in under four minutes."

References

Year of birth missing (living people)
Living people
Guinness World Records